The Madison Street Bridge, also known as the Lyric Opera Bridge, is a 1922 bascule bridge that spans the South Branch of the Chicago River in downtown Chicago, Illinois, United States.

References

External links
 
 Madison Street Bridge, Chicago, 1927, printed 1950s, Art Institute of Chicago

1922 establishments in Illinois
Bascule bridges in the United States
Bridges completed in 1922
Bridges in Chicago